King Solomon High School is a Modern Orthodox Judaism comprehensive school located in Barkingside, Greater London, England. It was opened in 1993 by its first headmaster, Mr Alastair Falk.

In March 2007, it was announced that Spencer Lewis would be appointed the new headteacher of the school, replacing the previous headmaster, Rabbi James Kennard.  According to The Jewish Chronicle, for 2011 non-Jewish students would make up 40% of the school. The school teaches mandatory Jewish Studies lessons to all of its pupils and offers a 2-week trip to Israel for students in Year 9 of the school. There used to be other school trips traditionally taken each year which was Belgium in Year 9. However, there are now no traditional trips to Belgium. There is also a 1-week trip to Poland for Year 12 6th form students. In the middle of 2013 it was announced that Spencer Lewis would be leaving Kantor King Solomon for other opportunities as Headmaster at Yavneh College. Jo Shuter was announced as his replacement. Following Jo Shuter's departure Dr Doherty was appointed to act as the interim(acting) headteacher.

In November 2016, the school was before formally renamed Kantor King Solomon High School after donations from Dr Moshe Kantor, the president of the European Jewish Congress. Following the 2022 Russian invasion of Ukraine , Dr Moshe Kantor has been sanctioned by the UK government  and the school has been renamed back to King Solomon High School.

As a comprehensive school, it follows the National Curriculum which is as follows:

Years 9-11 GCSE,
Years 12-13 (6th form) A levels and Tech Levels.

Notable former pupils
 Stacey Solomon – The X Factor finalist of 2009
 Jack Payne – Huddersfield Town A.F.C football player
 Katie Griffiths – Waterloo Road actress

References

Educational institutions established in 1993
Secondary schools in the London Borough of Redbridge
Jewish schools in England
1993 establishments in England
Voluntary aided schools in London